Musanga cecropioides, the African corkwood tree or umbrella tree, is found in tropical Africa from Sierra Leone south to Angola and east to Uganda. It is typical in secondary forests.

This tree is also known as parasolier, n'govoge, govwi, doe, kombo-kombo, musanga, and musanda.

Description
Its trunk has a pale whitish/yellow tone with a rough, granular texture.

Ecology
Musanga cecropioides is a pioneer species and readily springs up in newly cleared patches of forest. In Nigeria it is joined in these locations by the poison devil's-pepper (Rauvolfia vomitoria), the Ivory Coast almond (Terminalia ivorensis) and the dragon's blood tree (Harungana madagascariensis). Five years later, M. cecropioides has become dominant, with a closed canopy at

Uses
Uses of the wood from the African corkwood tree range from flotation devices, such as rafts, to toys. The wood of the African corkwood tree has a frail concreteness and has a tendency to mold and tarnish easily. The tree has traditional medical uses among the Bantu peoples of the Central African Republic, Gabon and Equatorial Guinea.

References

External links

USDA Forest Service Technical Fact Sheet: Musanga cecropioides
Gallery

Gallery

Urticaceae
Trees of Africa
Flora of East Tropical Africa
Flora of West-Central Tropical Africa
Flora of West Tropical Africa
Flora of Angola
Flora of Cabinda Province
Flora of Cameroon
Flora of the Democratic Republic of the Congo
Flora of Guinea
Flora of Niger
Flora of Nigeria
Flora of the Republic of the Congo
Flora of Sierra Leone
Flora of Uganda